Mansoor Hekmat (born Zhoobin Razani ; June 4, 1951 - July 4, 2002) was an Iranian Marxist, revolutionary and leader of the Worker-communist movement. He opposed the Shah and, after the 1979 Revolution, he first founded the movement of Revolutionary Marxism and in 1983 he co-founded the Communist Party of Iran which was opposed to the Islamic Republic of Iran. In 1991 he separated from this party and founded the Worker-communist Party of Iran (WPI), which he led until his death in 2002. He was the husband of fellow politician Azar Majedi.

Life
Born in Tehran, Hekmat moved to Shiraz, where he graduated in economics at the University of Shiraz, before moving to the UK where completed his Masters at Bath University. He moved to London in 1973 to start his Phd at Birkbeck University, where he studied under the supervision of Marxist theorist Ben Fine and became a critic of what he saw as distorted versions of communism, including Russian communism, Chinese communism, the guerrilla warfare movement, social democracy, Trotskyism and nationalism amongst the left.

He founded the Union of Communist Militants in 1979, then took part in the Iranian Revolution of 1979 – marked by the creation of workers' councils (shoras) – and, unlike the major part of the Iranian left-wing, refused to pay allegiance to Islamism and Supreme Leader Ruhollah Khomeini. He denounced the "myth of a progressive national bourgeoisie".

Because of mounting repression against political opposition groups in Iran, Hekmat sought refuge in Kurdistan in 1982. Hekmat's Union then fused with a Kurdish group of Maoist roots, Komalah – together, they formed the Communist Party of Iran (CPI) based on Revolutionary Marxism. Hekmat and a group of other CPI members left the party and, in 1991, founded the WPI. He also helped establish the Worker-Communist Party of Iraq.

He died of cancer in hospital in the UK and his headstone is at Highgate Cemetery, a few meters away from Karl Marx's grave.

Views
Hekmat supported the "return to Marx", and theorized that the working class is to rely only on itself - arguing that it had been the only class to impose beneficial changes in the 20th century. He opposed Stalinism and never accepted that either the Soviet Union or the People's Republic of China were socialist countries. He famously said "The basis of Socialism is the human being". Hekmat was also a practicing vegetarian and towards the end of his life became vegan.

Hekmat believed in free, legalised abortions but encouraged criticism of the strong feminist movements of his time whom he criticized as having a lack of compassion on this matter. He believed all should be done to create a world in which women are supported socially, economically, culturally and politically to keep their children, to reduce the need for abortions.

External links

The Official Mansoor Hekmat Website
Multi-lingual site of Mansoor Hekmat's works
Mansoor Hekmat Internet Archive
Worker-Communist Party of Iran
 Marx-Hekmat Society London
Mansoor Hekmat texts and information on the worker-communist movement in Iraq (in French)

1951 births
2002 deaths
Alumni of the University of Bath
Burials at Highgate Cemetery
Communist Party of Iran politicians
Former Muslim critics of Islam
Deaths from cancer in England
Iranian communists
Iranian dissidents
Iranian emigrants to the United Kingdom
Iranian Marxists
Iranian revolutionaries
Marxist humanists
Marxist theorists
People from Tehran
People of the Iranian Revolution
Shiraz University alumni
Worker-communist Party of Iran politicians